Charles 'Bones' Clements (21 March 1882 – 1 May 1927) was an Australian rules footballer who played for South Melbourne in the Victorian Football League (VFL).

Clements joined South Melbourne in 1904 after three seasons at Victorian Football Association (VFA) club Brunswick. A forward, Clements spent just two seasons with South Melbourne but managed to kick 68 goals, topping the club's goalkicking in both years.

Clements returned to Brunswick after the end of his VFL career, before moving first to Upper Goulburn Football Association club Murchison before moving back to the VFA at Northcote. While with Brunswick Clements kicked a club record 11 goals in a game against Essendon 'A', although he was mainly remembered by fans for his habit of leaving the ground at 1/2 time to drink three beers at a nearby pub before returning to the ground for the start of the third quarter (A break of no more than fifteen minutes).

References

Sources
 Atkinson, G. (1982) Everything you ever wanted to know about Australian rules football but couldn't be bothered asking, The Five Mile Press: Melbourne. .

External links

1882 births
Australian rules footballers from Melbourne
Australian Rules footballers: place kick exponents
Sydney Swans players
Brunswick Football Club players
Northcote Football Club players
Murchison Football Club players
Australian military personnel of World War I
1927 deaths
People from North Melbourne
Military personnel from Melbourne